Megan Stephanie Skaggs (born May 7, 1999 in Atlanta) is an American artistic gymnast. She was added to the US national gymnastics team in 2015, and she made her international debut at the 2015 City of Jesolo Trophy finished eighth in the all-around. She competed at the 2015 Pan American Games and won a gold medal with the team. She won a silver medal on beam behind Canadian Ellie Black.

On March 31, 2016, she retired from elite gymnastics. She signed the National Letter of Intent to the University of Florida and the Florida Gators gymnastics program on November 10, 2016.

References

1999 births
Living people
American female artistic gymnasts
Florida Gators women's gymnasts
Sportspeople from Atlanta
Sportspeople from Marietta, Georgia
Gymnasts at the 2015 Pan American Games
Pan American Games gold medalists for the United States
Pan American Games silver medalists for the United States
Pan American Games medalists in gymnastics
U.S. women's national team gymnasts
Medalists at the 2015 Pan American Games
21st-century American women